New Jersey kept its delegation at six seats but changed from electing its Representatives on a statewide general ticket to using three plural districts of two seats each.  These districts were used only for the 1812 election, and the state returned to using a single at-large district in 1814.  This was only the second time that New Jersey used districts (the first being in 1798).

There was a statewide at-large election held in November 1812, that was invalidated:

See also 
 United States House of Representatives elections, 1812 and 1813
 List of United States representatives from New Jersey

1813
New Jersey
United States House of Representatives